Seikphyu Township  is a township of Pakokku District in Magway Division of Burma (Myanmar). The principal town and administrative seat is Seikphyu.  The township has its southeastern border along the Irrawaddy where its principal town, Seikphyu, is a port.
The township lies between 20° 51' and 21° 15' north latitude and 94° 09' and 94° 48' east longitude. The Yaw River forms the township's eastern boundary. It is one of the areas destroyed by Cyclone Giri on 23 October 2010.

Borders
Seikphyu Township is bordered by:
 Pauk Township, to the north,
 Pakokku Township, to the northeast and east,
 Chauk Township, to the southeast,
 Salin Township, to the south, and
 Saw Township, to the west.

Economy
Agriculture is the major economy of the township. Onion from Seikphyu Township is famous in onion market of Myanmar. Onion is grown along the sandbank of Yaw River from December to April.

Secret projects
The State Peace and Development Council is constructing 2 secret nuclear suspected military projects on the northern side of Seikphyu Township along with other secret projects in Mindon, Padan, Pwintbyu, Sidoktaya, Salin, Pakkoku, Laung Shay (in Saw Township) and Saw Townships. Actually, the sites in Seikphyu Township are 2 factories for the production of military weapons and are not the nuclear projects.

Notes

External links
Admin map, 2011, Myanmar Information Management Unit (MIMU)
 "Seikpyu Google Satellite Map" map of administrative area with listing of principal settlements, from Maplandia World Gazetteer
 "Seik Phyu Township - Magway Division" map, 8 June 2010, Myanmar Information Management Unit (MIMU)

Townships of Magway Region